Cordulegaster sayi, commonly known as Say's spiketail, is a species of dragonfly in the family Cordulegastridae endemic to the United States.

References 

Insects of the United States
Cordulegastridae
Insects described in 1854
Taxonomy articles created by Polbot